The 1968 VPI Gobblers football team represented the Virginia Polytechnic Institute in the 1968 NCAA University Division football season. They finished the season with a 7–4 record.

Schedule

Players
The following players were members of the 1968 football team according to the roster published in the 1969 edition of The Bugle, the Virginia Tech yearbook.

References

VPI
Virginia Tech Hokies football seasons
VPI Gobblers football